Charles Williams (1693–1731) was a British stage actor.

Williams joined the company at the Theatre Royal, Drury Lane in 1718 and remained with it to his death in the year of his 38th birthday.

Selected roles
 Lorenzo in Love in a Veil by Richard Savage (1718)
 Herbis in The Siege of Damascus by John Hughes (1720)
 Alan in The Briton by Ambrose Philips (1722)
 Earl of Warwick in Humphrey, Duke of Gloucester by Ambrose Philips (1723)
 Ammon in The Fatal Constancy by Hildebrand Jacob (1723)
 Duke Frederick in Love in a Forest by Charles Johnson (1723)
 Araxes in The Captives by John Gay (1724)
 Decius in Caesar in Egypt by Colley Cibber (1724)
 Julio in Double Falsehood by Lewis Theobald (1727)
 Amyntas in Love in a Riddle by Colley Cibber (1729)
 Freeman in The Village Opera by Charles Johnson (1729)
 Scipio in Sophonisba by James Thomson (1730)
 Dinarchus in Timoleon by Benjamin Martyn (1730)

References

Bibliography
 Brean, Hammond (ed.) Double Falsehood. AC & Black, 2010.
 Highfill, Philip H, Burnim, Kalman A. & Langhans, Edward A. A Biographical Dictionary of Actors, Actresses, Musicians, Dancers, Managers, and Other Stage Personnel in London, 1660-1800: West to Zwingman. SIU Press, 1973.

18th-century English people
English male stage actors
British male stage actors
18th-century English male actors
18th-century British male actors
1693 births
1731 deaths
Date of birth unknown
Place of birth unknown
Place of death unknown
Date of death unknown